Demontre Hurst (born March 24, 1991) is a former American football cornerback. He played college football at Oklahoma and signed with the Chicago Bears as an undrafted free agent in 2013 and has also played for the Tennessee Titans.

Early years
Hurst played high school football for the Lancaster High School . He recorded 75 tackles, three fumble recoveries, one forced fumble, five interceptions and one interception return for a touchdown his senior year.

College career
Hurst played from 2009 to 2012 for the Oklahoma Sooners. He appeared in 53 games with 40 starts over four seasons at Oklahoma and totaled 178 tackles, 10 tackles for loss, two sacks for 17 yards, two interceptions for 104 yards, four forced fumbles, three fumble recoveries, and 33 passes defensed.

Professional career

Chicago Bears
Hurst was signed by the Chicago Bears on April 28, 2013, after going undrafted in the 2013 NFL Draft.

On August 31, 2013, Hurst was released by the Bears. On September 4, 2013, Hurst was signed to the Bears' practice squad. On December 11, 2013, Hurst signed a futures contract with the Bears.

On September 8, 2014, Hurst was released by the Bears. On September 18, 2014, Hurst was re-signed to the Chicago Bears' 53-man roster. On October 12, 2014, Hurst recorded his first interception of his career, intercepting Matt Ryan in the 4th quarter.

On September 19, 2015, Hurst was released by the Bears. On September 22, 2015, Hurst signed to the Chicago Bears' practice squad. On October 7, 2015, Hurst was promoted to the Bears' 53-man roster. On October 19, 2015, Hurst was released by the Bears. On October 21, 2015, Hurst was signed to the Bears' practice squad. On December 12, 2015, Hurst was promoted to the Bears' 53-man roster.

On September 3, 2016, Hurst was released by the Bears as part of the final roster cuts. On September 4, 2016, Hurst was signed to the practice squad the next day. On October 8, 2016, Hurst was promoted to the Bears' 53-man roster. On October 10, 2016, Hurst was released by the Bears. On October 12, 2016, Hurst signed to the Bears' practice squad two days later. On October 25, 2016, Hurst was promoted to the active roster. On December 11, 2016, Hurst recorded an interception, his first of the season, against the Detroit Lions.

Tennessee Titans
On April 3, 2017, Hurst signed with the Tennessee Titans. He was waived on September 2, 2017. He was re-signed by the Titans on December 22, 2017. He was waived on December 29, 2017.

On February 5, 2018, Hurst re-signed with the Titans. He was released on September 1, 2018.

Tampa Bay Vipers
Hurst was drafted in the 3rd round during phase four in the 2020 XFL Draft by the Tampa Bay Vipers. He had his contract terminated when the league suspended operations on April 10, 2020.

References

External links
Chicago Bears bio

Living people
1991 births
African-American players of American football
Players of American football from Texas
Sportspeople from the Dallas–Fort Worth metroplex
People from Lancaster, Texas
American football cornerbacks
Oklahoma Sooners football players
Chicago Bears players
Tennessee Titans players
Tampa Bay Vipers players
21st-century African-American sportspeople